Phosfolan (chemical formula: C7H14NO3PS2) is a chemical compound used as an insecticide.

References

External links

Acetylcholinesterase inhibitors
Organophosphate insecticides
Ethyl esters
Dithiolanes